Round ray may refer to a variety of ray fish:
Family Urotrygonidae (American round stingrays)
Family Urolophidae (round stingrays)
Heliotrygon genus
Urotrygon genus
Rajella fyllae (round ray, round skate)
Taeniurops meyeni (round ribbontail ray)
Urobatis halleri (Haller's round ray, little round stingray)
Urobatis maculatus (leopard round stingray)
Urobatis pardalis (Haller's round ray, little round stingray)